Diego Peralta (born 27 September 1996) is an Argentine football player who plays for Italian  club Foggia. He also holds Italian citizenship.

Club career
He made his professional debut in the Lega Pro for Pisa on 6 September 2015 in a game against Prato.

On 22 January 2019 he joined Olbia on loan.

On 12 September 2020 he signed a 2-year contract with Ternana.

On 19 July 2022, Peralta moved to Foggia on a two-year deal.

References

External links
 

1996 births
People from Posadas, Misiones
Argentine emigrants to Italy
Living people
Argentine footballers
Association football forwards
Pisa S.C. players
Extremadura UD B players
Extremadura UD footballers
Novara F.C. players
Olbia Calcio 1905 players
Ternana Calcio players
Calcio Foggia 1920 players
Serie C players
Serie B players
Segunda División B players
Tercera División players
Argentine expatriate footballers
Expatriate footballers in Spain
Sportspeople from Misiones Province